Dandagaun is a Village Development Committee in Kabhrepalanchok District in Bagmati Province of central Nepal. At the time of the 1991 Nepal census it had a population of 2,365 and had 374 houses in it.

References

External links
UN map of the municipalities of Kavrepalanchowk District

Populated places in Kavrepalanchok District